The Power may refer to:

Films
 The Power (1968 film), an American science fiction thriller film based on the novel by Frank M. Robinson
 The Power (1984 film), an American supernatural horror film directed by Stephen Carpenter and Jeffrey Obrow
 The Power (2021 British film), a British horror film written and directed by Corinna Faith
 The Power (2021 Indian film), an Indian action thriller film written and directed by Mahesh Manjrekar

Literature
 The Power (Alderman novel), a 2016 science fiction novel by the British writer Naomi Alderman
 The Power (Robinson novel), a 1956 science fiction novel by American writer Frank M. Robinson
 The Power (self-help book), 2010 self-help and spirituality book written by Rhonda Byrne
 "The Power", a story by American writer of science fiction Murray Leinster

Music
 The Power (album), the debut studio album by Australian pop singer Vanessa Amorosi

Songs
 "The Power" (DJ Fresh song), a single by English producer DJ Fresh, released as the third single from his album Nextlevelism
 "The Power" (Snap! song), song by German Eurodance group Snap!
 "The Power" (Vanessa Amorosi song), the fourth single from Australian recording artist Vanessa Amorosi's debut album
 "The Power / Kanashiki Heaven (Single Version)", the 25th major single by the Japanese female idol group Cute
 "The Power", the ninth song from Die Krupps' 1992 album I
 "The Power", the sixth song from Suede's 1994 album Dog Man Star

Other
 The Power (TV series), an upcoming television series based on the novel by Naomi Alderman
"The Power" (Studio One), an episode of the CBS television anthology series Studio One
 "The Power", a first season episode of the animated comedy television series Regular Show
 Phil "The Power" Taylor (born 1960), English former professional darts player

See also
Power (disambiguation)